This is a list of the squads that qualified for the 2011 Champions League Twenty20.

Southern Redbacks
Coach:  Darren Berry

New South Wales Blues
Coach:  Anthony Stuart

Warriors
Coach:  Russell Domingo

Cape Cobras
Coach:  Richard Pybus

Mumbai Indians
Coach:  Robin Singh

Royal Challengers Bangalore
Coach:  Ray Jennings

Chennai Super Kings
Coach:  Stephen Fleming

Kolkata Knight Riders
Coach:  Dav Whatmore

Auckland Aces
Coach:  Paul Strang

Trinidad and Tobago
Coach:  Kelvin Williams

Ruhuna

Somerset
Coach:  Andrew Hurry

Leicestershire Foxes
Coach:  Phil Whitticase

References

External links
 2011 Champions League Twenty20 squads on ESPN CricInfo

Champions League Twenty20 squads